The Samsung Galaxy Watch 4 (stylized as Samsung Galaxy Watch4) is a smartwatch developed by Samsung Electronics. It is the first Samsung watch to run Google's Wear OS since the Samsung Gear Live, and the first watch to run Wear OS 3, co-developed by Samsung and Google. The device largely followed the design language of the preceding Samsung Galaxy Watch Active and Galaxy Watch 3, but including all new software. The watch also included EKG, body compositional analysis, and blood pressure monitoring via the new Samsung BioActive sensor. It was announced on August 11, 2021, at Samsung's Unpacked Event alongside the Samsung Galaxy Z Flip 3, Samsung Galaxy Z Fold 3 and Galaxy Buds 2.  The watch was released on August 27 worldwide.

Specifications

Software 
The smartwatch was the first watch released by Samsung to use Wear OS instead of Samsung's own Tizen OS.

This smartwatch is region locked in mainland China, unlike past models.

Supported languages and regions 
Unlike past Wear OS devices, Wear OS 3 supports a wider variety of languages that the end user can choose from. An ADB command can be used to temporarily change the watch's language to another one, which will reset when the device is reconnected to the phone.

Depending on the region where the device was sold from, the language and region options may differ.

See also 
 Samsung Galaxy Z Fold 3
 Samsung Galaxy Z Flip 3
 Samsung Galaxy Buds 2

References

External links 

Samsung
Samsung Galaxy
Samsung wearable devices
Smartwatches
Wear OS devices